Sant Miquel de Cruïlles is a Benedictine monastery in Cruïlles, Monells i Sant Sadurní de l'Heura,  Catalonia, Spain.  The 11th-century building, in First Romanesque style, was declared a Bien de Interés Cultural landmark in 1931.

See also
 History of medieval Arabic and Western European domes

Bibliography
 Pladevall, Antoni (2000). Guies Catalunya Romànica, El Baix Empordà-La Selva. Barcelona, Pòrtic.  (Catalán).

External links

Benedictine monasteries in Catalonia
Bien de Interés Cultural landmarks in the Province of Girona
Christian monasteries established in the 11th century
Romanesque architecture in Catalonia